Tamuna Sirbiladze (12 February 19712 March 2016) was an artist based in Vienna, Austria.

Life 

Sirbiladze was born in Tbilisi in Georgia. She studied art at the Tbilisi State Academy of Arts (19891994) in Georgia and later the Academy of Fine Arts Vienna (19972003) and Slade School of Fine Art, London, 2003. She was the widow of fellow artist Franz West (19472012) and collaborated with West on a number of projects.

Sirbiladze's background influenced her approach to painting: "Sirbiladze was exposed to art mostly through booksher home country had few museums. She knew early on that she wanted to be an artist, however, and cited the colors of the art she came across as the reason she ended up painting."

Work 

Sirbiladze painted fast, and sometimes incorporated text into her work. An Art in America review in 2015 noted the "energetic content" of her work, adding that "Sirbiladze’s line is spare; abundant, creamy negative space supports the gentle diagonal flow of marks". Alex Greenberger wrote that her "... paintings played with the division between figuration and abstraction" and "...  recall the work of Henri Matisse and the Impressionists in their light, expressive brushwork".

Sirbiladze had two solo shows in New York in 2015, at Half Gallery and James Fuentes.

Exhibitions 

 HamsterwheelArsenaleVenice
 Tamuna SirbiladzeTake It EasyHalf Gallery, New York City, NY
 Tamuna Sirbiladze: "Good Enough Is Never Good EnoughJames Fuentes LLC, New York City, NY

References 

1971 births
Artists from Georgia (country)
Living people